Garden City Community College (Garden City CC or GCCC) is a public community college in Garden City, Kansas. It was established in 1919 to provide a means for post-secondary education for area residents. The school initially shared facilities in Sabine Hall and Calkins Hall in the 100 block of Buffalo Jones Avenue with Garden City High School and opened with a first class of less than three dozen students. The college moved to the then-new Garden City High School building in 1954. The Kansas Legislature passed the Community College Act in 1965, authorizing establishment of 22 independent colleges including GCCC. Today GCCC is one of 19 Kansas community colleges.

Garden City Community College is a member of the Kansas Jayhawk Community College Conference and offers a variety of sports programs, referred to as the Broncbusters and Lady Broncbusters. GCCC has experienced large success in football, basketball, and baseball.

History

Early years
The first four community colleges in Kansas were established in 1919, and GCCC is one of two from that group which still exist. It was created by county-wide election on April 1, 1919, and opened in September of the same year. GCCC initially shared facilities in Sabine Hall and Calkins Hall in the 100 block of Buffalo Jones Avenue with Garden City High School, and opened with a first class of less than three dozen students. The first graduate, Mildred Hope of Garden City, earned her degree in the spring of 1920.

1950s–1990s
The college moved to the then-new Garden City High School building in 1954, and first occupied a campus of its own in 1958 on property where Buffalo Jones Elementary School is located. The first effort to establish GCCC as an entity separate from the Garden City public school system was launched in 1958. It was killed in a Kansas legislative committee, a second attempt was also rejected in 1962. In 1963, the college moved back to Sabine and Calkins Halls, and also made use of nearby Ben Grimsley Gym, as well as a group of adjacent World War II-era barracks buildings.

The Kansas Legislature passed the Community College Act in 1965, authorizing establishment of 22 independent colleges including GCCC. This authorized the institution to levy taxes, conduct its own programs, and function independently of the K-12 school system. County voters elected the first GCCC Board of Trustees in July 1965. Today, GCCC is one of 19 Kansas community colleges. The present 14-building,  campus at 801 Campus Drive was designed between July 1965 and January 1966.

Voters approved a $2.5 million bond issue, supplemented by a $538,000 federal grant for construction. Erected between 1968 and 1970 were the original residence hall, Academic Building, Saffell Library, Administration Building, Fouse Science-Math Building, Pauline Joyce Fine Arts Building and Physical Education Building. The Collins Technical Building was added in 1974, and a residential life addition was built in 1978. The Penka Building was added in 1986, when additions were completed to the Joyce, Collins and PE Buildings. Williams Stadium, a baseball facility, was also added.

2000s–present
The , three-level, two-story Student and Community Services Center opened in August 2006 and was dedicated in October of the same year. Attached to the original Administration Building, the $3.12 million facility consolidated public and student services, provided an on-campus home for adult basic education, added a series of 21st-century classrooms and created a single point of assistance for most services GCCC provides.

In the summer of 2018, the college board of trustees fired the college's president, Herbert Swender, after the college's faculty senate presented the board with a report describing "bullying, intimidation, sexual harassment and retaliation allegations against Swender and concerns about the college’s upcoming accreditation review." His termination agreement with the college includes continued employment through the end of 2018 as a consultant.

Accreditation
Garden City Community College is accredited by the Higher Learning Commission.  The GCCC Nursing Program is accredited by the Kansas State Board of Nursing and the National League for Nursing Accrediting Commission (NLNAC). Certain GCCC programs have also obtained other specific individual accreditation.

Athletics

The athletic teams offered at GCCC are referred to as the Broncbusters and compete in the  Kansas Jayhawk Community College Conference. Named Tangeman Fields in honor of Dr. James Tangeman, a former president, the property includes softball and baseball facilities. Also located there are the college's indoor baseball practice building, a football practice area, running track with public seating, and soccer fields.

Gallery

Notable alumni
 Don O. Concannon, Chairman of the Kansas Republican Party from 1968 to 1970, Candidate for Governor in 1974
 Corey Dillon, former NFL player for the New England Patriots and Cincinnati Bengals
 Mike Friede, gridiron football player
Eric Griffin, basketball player for Hapoel Be'er Sheva of the Israeli Basketball Premier League
 Darrin Hancock, former NBA player
 Kay-Jay Harris, former NFL player for the New York Giants, St. Louis Rams, and Miami Dolphins
 Tyreek Hill, football player for the Miami Dolphins
 Corey Jenkins, former NFL player for the Miami Dolphins and Chicago Bears
 C.J. Jones, former NFL player for several teams
 Gene Keady, basketball coach for Purdue Boilermakers and member of the College Basketball Hall of Fame
 Phil Loadholt, NFL player for the Minnesota Vikings
 Nick Marshall, quarterback for the Auburn Tigers
 Dayton Moore, baseball executive for the Texas Rangers
 Frank Murphy, former NFL and UFL player
 Darvis Patton, "Doc", retired sprinter in track and field, three-time Olympian (two silver medals), four-time participant at the World Championships (multiple medals, including two golds)
 Derrick Pope, former NFL and CFL player for several teams
Tyler Rogers, Major League Baseball player for the San Francisco Giants
 Keith Smart, former NBA player for the San Antonio Spurs, assistant coach for the Arkansas Razorbacks
 Tyson Thompson, former NFL player for the Dallas Cowboys
 Brent Venables, Head football coach at Oklahoma

References

External links
 

 
Two-year colleges in the United States
Community colleges in Kansas
Education in Finney County, Kansas
Buildings and structures in Finney County, Kansas
NJCAA athletics
Educational institutions established in 1919
1919 establishments in Kansas